The Channel Magazine (referred to as The Channel) is an American entertainment magazine headquartered in Philadelphia, Pennsylvania, and owned by All Access Media, Inc. The first issue was published on April 23, 2007, and is known as being among the more informative entertainment magazines in the business. The magazine focuses on music, film, fashion, entertainment business, and popular culture.

History
Owned by All Access Media, Inc. the first issue was published on April 23, 2007, and featured musician Mick Fleetwood on its cover. By 2008, the magazine's monthly circulation averaged 375 thousand copies per month. In January 2009, editor Neal Stevens oversaw the launch and overall design of the online version of the magazine.

Typical content and frequency
The magazine features celebrities and independent artists on the cover and addresses focuses on topics such as music, movies, fashion, business, and technology, etc.

It publishes bi-monthly issues each year that are available on newsstands and online; the online version of the magazine is updated every two weeks.

References

External links

2007 establishments in Pennsylvania
Bimonthly magazines published in the United States
Film magazines published in the United States
Entertainment magazines published in the United States
Magazines established in 2007
Magazines published in Philadelphia
Television magazines published in the United States